Jesus freak is a pejorative term for Christians.

Jesus Freak may also refer to:

Jesus Freak (album), a 1995 album by dc Talk
"Jesus Freak" (song), the title song of the album
Jesus Freaks (book), a 1999 book by the band dc Talk and the organization Voice of the Martyrs
Jesus Freak (film), a 2003 US feature film by Morgan Nichols
Jesus Freaks (youth movement), a German youth movement